Michele Riondino (born 14 March 1979) is an Italian actor.

Born in Taranto, Riondino enrolled at the Silvio D'Amico National Academy of Dramatic Art, graduating in 2000. In 2006, he acted in The Black Arrow, a TV series broadcast by Canale 5, directed by Fabrizio Costa. His acting breakthrough came in 2008, with The Past Is a Foreign Land, for which he was awarded best actor at the Rome Film Festival and at the Miami International Film Festival.

In 2010, Riondino was appointed EFP Shooting Star at the Berlin International Film Festival and received the Guglielmo Biraghi Award at the 67th Venice International Film Festival.  He has been playing the title character in the RAI TV-series The Young Montalbano since 2012.

Selected filmography 
 The Past Is a Foreign Land (2008)
 Fort Apache Napoli (2009)
 Small Sea (2009)
 Ten Winters (2009)
 Noi credevamo (2010)
 Steel (2012)
 The Young Montalbano (2012)
 Dormant Beauty (2012)
 Leopardi (2014)
 Wondrous Boccaccio (2015)
 Worldly Girl (2016)

References

External links 
 

1979 births
People from Taranto
Italian male stage actors
Italian male film actors
Italian male television actors
Living people
21st-century Italian male actors
Accademia Nazionale di Arte Drammatica Silvio D'Amico alumni